Thomas Raymond Mays  (1 August 1899 – 6 January 1980) was an auto racing driver and entrepreneur from Bourne, Lincolnshire, England.

He attended Oundle School, where he met Amherst Villiers, leaving at the end of 1917. After army service in the Grenadier Guards in France, he attended Christ's College, Cambridge, taking his first win at Brooklands while an undergraduate.

Racing career

Mays was one of the principal people behind the development of the motor racing stables of English Racing Automobiles (ERA) and British Racing Motors (BRM). The workshops of each firm were established, in turn, behind the family home on Eastgate Road in Bourne.

Mays raced for some thirty years, competing in various cars: a Speed-model 1½-litre Hillman, two 1½-litre Bugattis, an unsuccessful supercharged AC, the Vauxhall-Villiers, Mercedes, Invictas, Rileys and ERAs. Mays was renowned for competing at Shelsley Walsh, racing there in the early 1920s with a pair of Brescia Bugattis, known as 'Cordon Bleu' and 'Cordon Rouge'. He developed his cars with superchargers through Amherst Villiers and this association continued from AC to the Vauxhall-Villiers and then the famous 'White Riley', that eventually became the starting point for ERA.

In 1929, Raymond Mays entered the Vauxhall-Villiers at Shelsley Walsh fitted with twin rear wheels; according to Mays "the first time that any car had competed at any hill climb so equipped." He broke the hill record and this innovation was widely copied in the years to come.

Mays made his mark on the track in such events as the 1935 German Grand Prix (scene of a famous victory of Tazio Nuvolari), sharing his ERA with Ernst von Delius. The ribbon which came with the wreath which was part of the prize for this event is to be seen at the Raymond Mays room in Bourne Heritage Centre. Reflecting on his career in his 1969 Desert Island Discs appearance, he considered his favourite race to be his victory earlier in the same year in the voiturette class of the Eifelrennen, beating out such entries as the private ERA of Dick Seaman to take the chequered flag.

Mays was one of ERA's most notable drivers, winning the British Hill Climb Championship in its first two years, 1947 and 1948 and also the Brighton Speed Trials in 1946, 1947, 1948 and 1950 in his black ERA R4D. He stopped driving racing cars at the end of the 1950 season.

In the 1950s and 1960s Mays produced and marketed tuning equipment for British Ford four- and six-cylinder engines, including an alloy cylinder head designed by Mays's ERA and BRM associate Peter Berthon. These parts were fitted to Ford, A.C., and Reliant cars.
Mays described these events and others to Roy Plomley in Desert Island Discs on 25 October 1969. Mays wrote three books, Split Seconds, BRM and At Speed.

Racing record

Complete European Championship results
(key) (Races in bold indicate pole position) (Races in italics indicate fastest lap)

References

Bibliography

 Split Seconds: My Racing Years by Raymond Mays "ghosted" by Dennis May, G.T. Foulis & Co. Ltd. 1951. 306 pages.
 B.R.M. by Raymond Mays and Peter Roberts. (Cassell & Co. Ltd., 35, Red Lion Square, London W.C.1. 30s.) 1962. 240 pages.

ERA R4D - The Autobiography of R4D by Mac Hulbert

External links
 The Bourne web site
 Raymond Mays history site
 The Raymond Mays Room
 Photograph from 1956 on flickr: 
 T W Mays & Son Limited, Bourne

1899 births
1980 deaths
People from Bourne, Lincolnshire
People educated at Oundle School
Alumni of Christ's College, Cambridge
Commanders of the Order of the British Empire
English racing drivers
Brooklands people
British hillclimb drivers
Brighton Speed Trials people
European Championship drivers
Formula One team owners
Grand Prix drivers